David Bright is the name of:

 David Bright (diver) (1957–2006), American professional wreck diver
 David Bright (footballer) (born 1972), English footballer for Stoke City
 David Bright (football manager) (1956–2021), Botswana association football coach currently managing Bay United
Dave Bright (born 1949), English-New Zealand footballer